Monaco competed at the 2012 Winter Youth Olympics in Innsbruck, Austria. The Monegasque team was made up of three athletes in two sports.

Medalists

Alpine skiing

Monaco qualified one boy in alpine skiing.

Boy

Bobsleigh

Monaco will send a pair of athletes to compete in the two-man bobsled event.

See also
Monaco at the 2012 Summer Olympics

References

Nations at the 2012 Winter Youth Olympics
2012 in Monégasque sport
Monaco at the Youth Olympics